"Fallin' Out of Love" is a song written by Jon Ims, and recorded by American country music artist Reba McEntire.  It was released in May 1991 as the fourth and final single from her album Rumor Has It.  The song reached #2 on the Billboard Hot Country Singles & Tracks chart in August 1991.

Content
In the song, the narrator is addressing a woman who has been suddenly abandoned by her lover for another woman. The woman is heartbroken, but while driving around town to clear her mind, has an ephiphany: she can live without him. One day, her old lover calls her (apparently wanting to get back together), but she informs him that she's moved on.

Chart performance

Year-end charts

References

1991 singles
1990 songs
Reba McEntire songs
Song recordings produced by Tony Brown (record producer)
MCA Records singles